Shoppers Mall is the largest enclosed shopping center in Brandon, Manitoba. It offers over 90 stores and services including a movie theatre and food court. The anchor tenants of the mall are Sport Chek, Landmark Cinemas,  Sobeys Extra, GoodLife Fitness, Shoppers Drug Mart, and Dollarama.

References

Buildings and structures in Brandon, Manitoba
Shopping malls in Manitoba